John Stanley Marshall (born 28 August 1941) is an English retired drummer and founding member of the jazz rock band Nucleus. From 1972 to 1978, he was the drummer for Soft Machine, replacing Phil Howard when he joined.

Marshall was born in Isleworth, Middlesex, and has worked with various jazz and rock bands and musicians, among them J. J. Jackson, Allan Holdsworth, Barney Kessel, Alexis Korner, Graham Collier, Michael Gibbs, Arthur Brown, Keith Tippett, Centipede, Jack Bruce, John McLaughlin, Dick Morrissey, Hugh Hopper, Elton Dean, John Surman, Charlie Mariano, John Abercrombie, Arild Andersen, and Eberhard Weber's Colours.

Since 1999, he has worked with former Soft Machine co-musicians in several Soft Machine-related projects like SoftWare, SoftWorks and Soft Machine Legacy.  He toured as a member of the band, which operates under the name Soft Machine again, from 2015 to 2023.

Discography

with Nucleus
 Elastic Rock (1970, Vertigo)
 We'll Talk About It Later (1971, Vertigo)
 Solar Plexus (1971, Vertigo)
 Live at Theaterhaus (1985, Mood)
 Ian Carr: Old Heartland (1988, EMI)

with Soft Machine
Studio
 Fifth (1972, CBS)
 Six (1973, CBS)
 Seven (1973, CBS)
 Bundles (1975, Harvest)
 Softs (1976, Harvest)
 Land of Cockayne (1981, EMI)
 Abracadabra (as Soft Works) (2003, Tone Center)
 Soft Machine Legacy (as Soft Machine Legacy) (2006, Moonjune)
 Steam (as Soft Machine Legacy) (2007, Moonjune)
 Burden of Proof (as Soft Machine Legacy) (2013, Moonjune)
 Hidden Details (2018, Moonjune)
Live
 NDR Jazz Workshop - Live (1973, Cuneiform)
 Switzerland Live (recorded 1974, released 2015, Vivid Sound)
 Floating World Live (recorded 1975, released 2006, MoonJune)
 British Tour '75 (recorded 1975, released 2005, Major League Productions)
 Alive & Well: Recorded in Paris (1978, Harvest)
 BBC Radio 1 Live in Concert [rec.1972] (1994, Windsong)
 Live in France [recorded 1972] (1994, One Way)
 Live in Zaandam (as Soft Machine Legacy) (2005, Moonjune)
 Live At The New Morning (as Soft Machine Legacy) (2006, in-akustik)
 Live Adventures (as Soft Machine Legacy) (2010, Moonjune)

with Eberhard Weber's Colours
 Silent Feet (ECM, 1977)
 Pop Jazz International (Amiga, 1979)
 Little Movements (ECM, 1980)

As sideman
With Jack Bruce
 Harmony Row (Atco, 1971)

With John Surman
 Conflagration (Dawn, 1971)
 Morning Glory (Island, 1973)
 The Brass Project (ECM, 1992)
 Stranger than Fiction (ECM, 1993)

With Vassilis Tsabropoulos
 Achirana (ECM, 1999)

With others

 Graham Collier/Deep Dark Blue Centre (1967, Deram)
 Michael Garrick/Jazz Praises at St Paul's (1968, Airborne)
 Barney Kessel/Blue Soul (1968, Black Lion)
 Barney Kessel/Swinging Easy (1968, Black Lion)
 Graham Collier/Down Another Road (1969, Fontana)
 Neil Ardley/Greek Variations (1969, Columbia)
 Jack Bruce/Songs for a Tailor (1969, Polydor)
 Michael Gibbs/Michael Gibbs (1969, Deram)
 Mike Westbrook/Marching Song Vol. I & II (1969, Deram)
 Georgie Fame/Seventh Son (1969, CBS)
 Arthur Brown/Crazy World of Arthur Brown (1969, Track)
 Indo-Jazz Fusions/Etudes (1969, Sonet)
 Lloyd Webber/Rice/Jesus Christ Superstar (1970, Decca)
 Bill Fay/Bill Fay (1970, Deram)
 Mike d'Abo/Michael D'Abo (1970, Uni)
 Chris Spedding/Songs Without Words (1970, Harvest)
 Top Topham/Ascension Heights (1970, Blue Horizon)
 Michael Gibbs/Tanglewood '63 (1970, Deram)
 Chitinous Ensemble/Chitinous Ensemble (1971, Deram)
 Linda Hoyle/Pieces of Me (1971, Vertigo)
 Spontaneous Music Orchestra/Live: Big Band/Quartet (1971, Vinyl)
 Mike Westbrook/Metropolis (1971, RCA)
 Centipede/Septober Energy (1971, Neo)
 Michael Gibbs/Just Ahead (1972, Polydor)
 Alexis Korner/Bootleg Him (1972, Rak Srak)
 Volker Kriegel/Inside:The Missing Link (1972, MPS)
 Hugh Hopper/1984 (1973, CBS)
 John Williams/Height Below (1973, Hi Fly)
 Volker Kriegel/Lift (1973, MPS)
 Pork Pie (Van 't Hof. Mariano, Catherine, Marshall)/The Door is Open (1975, MPS)
 Charlie Mariano/HelenTwelveTrees (1976, MPS)
 Elton Dean & Alan Skidmore/El Skid (1977, Vinyl)
 Jasper van 't Hof & George Gruntz/Fairy Tales (1978, MPS)
 Gil Evans/The British Orchestra (1983, Mole)
 Uli Beckerhoff, Jasper van 't Hof, John Marshall/Camporondo (1986, Nabel)
 Uli Beckerhoff, John Abercrombie, Arild Andersen, John Marshall/Secret Obsession (1991, Nabel)
 Wolfgang Mirbach/Links (1992, Schlozzton)
 Towering Inferno/Kaddish (1993, Tl Records)
 Michael Gibbs/By The Way (1994, Ah Um)
 Theo Travis/View From The Edge (1994, 33 Records)
 Jandl/Glawischnig/Laut & Luise (1995, Hat Hut/Du)
 Graham Collier/Charles River Fragments (1995, Boathouse)
 Mirbach/Links/New Reasons to Use Old Words (1995, Schlozzton)
 Jack Bruce & Friends/Live in Concert [rec.1971] (1995, Windsong)
 Christoph Oeding/Taking a Chance (1997, Mons)
 Marshall Travis Wood/Bodywork (1998, 33 Records)
 Roy Powell/North by Northwest (1998, released 2001, Nagel-Heyer)

References

External links
An interview with John Marshall

Living people
1941 births
People from Isleworth
English jazz drummers
Canterbury scene
Nucleus (band) members
Soft Machine members
Centipede (band) members